Domeabra is a small town in the Nkoranza North district, a district in the Western Region of Ghana.

Education
Domeabra is known for the Owerriman Secondary School. The school is a second cycle institution.

Healthcare
The Saint John of God Hospital is located in Domeabra.

See also
 Nkoranza North (Ghana parliament constituency)

References

Populated places in the Brong-Ahafo Region